1959 college football season may refer to:

 1959 NCAA University Division football season
 1959 NCAA College Division football season
 1959 NAIA football season